The motorway RA15, also known as Tangenziale di Catania or Catania's By Pass (West), is a motorway to contour Catania in Sicily, running from north to south, west of the city. It is 23.3 km long and it is managed by ANAS. It is also part of the European route E45. It was opened on 28 May 1985 and was called T09 until the 1990s.

By Pass (West)
The RA15 is connected to the A18 to Messina, the A19 to Palermo and to all of the major national roads of Eastern Sicily. Since 2009 it is also linked to the A CT-SR to Syracuse.

RA15

By Pass (East)
The initial project had on the plans a second service road going through the city called By Pass East (today's A18dir) but due to the highly urbanized situation of Catania the project has never been completed leaving the road to terminate in the northern part of the city.
In the southern part of Catania, in July 2010 was completed another 5,0 km of service road called "Asse attrezzato", part of the initial project of the 1970s. This service road connects the motorway A19 to Palermo and the RA 15 to the southern part of the city. This second stretch of service road is not classified as motorway.

A18dir Diramazione Catania nord

Asse attrezzato

External links

Autostrade in Italy
Transport in Catania
Ring roads in Italy